Bogan Hunters is an Australian comedy reality television series created by Paul Fenech for Seven Network's 7mate. The series provides an in-depth look into Australia's bogan subculture, as the Bogan Hunters traverse the nation looking for Australia's greatest bogan. The show first aired on Australia's 7mate on 13 May 2014 and on New Zealand's TV2 on 14 October 2014. The finale of season 1 aired on 15 July 2014 in Australia and on 9 December 2014 in New Zealand.

On 8 February 2015, two Bogan Hunters specials aired titled "Summernats And The Hunt For The Great Aussie Hoon" and "Bathurst Conspiracy".

Overview
The show follows the adventures of 'boganologist' Paul 'Pauly' Fenech, Shazza (Elle Dawe) and Kev the Kiwi (Kevin Taumata) as they travel around Australia in search of the nation's greatest bogan, tapping into a growing interest and fascination in Australia's unique version of the subculture. Their quest takes them to all of Australia's states and territories, except for the ACT, revealing the diversity of bogan culture throughout the nation. After searching in many regions with significant bogan populations, seven of the finest bogans down under are selected by a panel of eight celebrity judges to compete in a Bogan Grand Final in Sydney, where criteria such as appearance, attitude and sex appeal are measured. The winners of the 2014 showdown are granted a "Golden Thong Award", and a beer keg laden "Aussie pride 'Straya' ute" or a makeover. Series 1 focused on suburban bogans, located about 20 minutes drive from the center of Australia's largest cities. 

Many of the shows' main characters and judges have previously appeared in the SBS television series Pizza, Swift and Shift Couriers and Housos.

Outcomes

Tasmania
Tasmania was named the 'bogan capital of Australia' with Taswegians earning four spots in the final.  On the island of Tasmania, half the population has literacy and/or numeracy difficulties, and the unemployment rate is higher than it is in mainland Australia.

The producers of Bogan Hunters wanted to interview Bertrant Cadert, the Mayor of the Municipality of Glamorgan Spring Bay about the controversy surrounding the word bogan, after he labeled the residents of Triabunna as "the most bogan of bogans" using the word in a derogatory sense. Cadert declined the interview.

The show has become a part of Tasmanian culture, with "Bogan Hunters" being the 11th most popular search term on Google in 2014 for users from Tasmania.

Australian culture
The show, while light hearted and presented in a comedic fashion, accurately documents the widespread extent and manifestations of the real bogan culture in Australia.

Fat Pizza vs. Housos
Some of the show's finalists appeared in the 2014 motion picture Fat Pizza vs. Housos, which began showing in Australian cinemas on 27 November 2014.

Production
When asked about the production of the series and if the participants were enthusiastic about the project, producer Paul Fenech stated:

Reviews
The show was praised by critics such as Scott Ellis and Louise Rugendyke from The Sydney Morning Herald "The Guide". They have speculated that some of the characters could use a little more help than is afforded to them, highlighting the importance of shining the spotlight on them.

Reception
The 9:30pm premiere of Bogan Hunters on 7mate rated 390,000 mainland capital city viewers and 589,000 viewers Australia wide, making it the highest-rating entertainment program ever to screen on the three-year-old digital channel and the second highest rating show to date. It led in multichannel ratings for the night, far ahead of shows such as Parenthood on Seven Network's primary channel. The second episode was slightly higher with 393,000 mainland capital city viewers, and was also the night's highest rating program on a multichannel.

Season 1 of Bogan Hunters enjoyed more viewers than many other Australian comedies of its era, such as the ABC's Jonah from Tonga, which later screened on HBO in the United States and BBC Three in the United Kingdom.

Season 1 (2014)

Series overview

Episodes

Season 1 (2014)

Cast and characters

Main
 Paul Fenech as Pauly
 Elle Dawe as Shazza Jones
 Kevin Taumata as Kev the Kiwi

Celebrity Judges
 Angry Anderson as himself
 Jonesy as himself
 Amarli Inez as Miss Nude Australia
 Tahir Bilgiç as himself
 Mick Gatto as himself
 Mark "Jacko" Jackson as himself
 Chris Franklin as himself
 Derek Boyer as himself
 Rob Shehadie as himself
 Guy Sebastian as himself

Other
 Davey Cooper as himself 
 Jimmy Jackson as James aka Big Wheels
 June Dally-Watkins as herself
 Henry Roth as himself
 Martin Miller as Marty the Engineer
 Alex Romano as Jimmy

International broadcasting

See also

 Bogan
 Housos
 Fat Pizza vs. Housos
 Culture of Australia
 Television in Australia

References

External links

Official Site
Facebook page
Twitter page
Bogan Hunters, Series 1 Raw and Uncut
Bring Bogan Hunters to New Zealand

English-language television shows
2010s Australian comedy television series
2010s Australian reality television series
2014 Australian television series debuts
Television shows set in Australia
7mate original programming
TVNZ 2 original programming
Mass media portrayals of the working class
Working class in Australia
Television shows filmed in Australia